The 1882 United States House of Representatives elections in Florida were held November 7 for the 48th Congress

Background
In the previous election, two Democrats had been elected to represent Florida.

The 2nd district had been a contentious district in previous elections, with the past 4 elections being contested successfully.

Election results
Both incumbents ran successfully for re-election.  In the 2nd district, both contestants had served for part of the 47th Congress.

This was the last Congressional election in Florida won by a Republican until 1954

1st District

Results

2nd District

Results

See also
United States House of Representatives elections, 1882

References

1882
Florida
United States House of Representatives